Huron Towers is the name of a pair of twin apartment buildings in Ann Arbor, Michigan.

They are located at 2200 Fuller Court.

Huron Towers West 

Huron Towers West was built in 1960, and stands at 14 floors in height. The residential high-rise includes a restaurant, retail space, and a fitness center.

It is designed in the modern architectural style.

Huron Towers East 
Huron Towers East is the twin of Huron Towers West, and is built identically to it. The high-rise has the same facilities as its twin, built in 1960.

Description 
 This twin apartment complex lies outside of downtown.

References

External links 
 Official website
 Google Maps location of Huron Towers East and West
 
 
 
 

Skyscrapers in Ann Arbor, Michigan
Residential skyscrapers in Michigan